Sittenfeld is a surname. Notable people with the surname include:

 Curtis Sittenfeld (born 1975), American novelist
 P.G. Sittenfeld (born 1984), American politician
 Stanislaus Sittenfeld (1865–1902), Polish–French chess master